The third and final season of the Australian drama television series Wonderland, began airing on 4 February 2015 on Network Ten. The series concluded on 20 May 2015

Production 
On 22 January 2014, it was announced that Network Ten had ordered another 22 episodes of Wonderland. Of the 22 episodes, only 16 would be aired as the third season. 

Rick Maier, the head of Drama at Ten stated, "All power to the cast and crew who delivered such a fun show for us last year. We are looking forward to more stories of love, lust and intrigue from the busiest and most romantic block of flats in the country." Filming for the third season was back-to-back with the second season - it commenced in March 2014 and wrapped in December 2014.

Of the third season, Tim Ross stated, "[Season three] gets intense. A lot of things happen to the characters, but we don't know if it [season three] will be the last. We would love to do another season."

Plot 
Set in an apartment building on the doorstep of one of Australia's most beautiful beaches, Wonderland is a warm, light-hearted and engaging relationship drama revolving around four very different couples as they navigate the pitfalls of love, meet the challenges life presents head on, and pursue their dreams.

With an idyllic beachside as the backdrop, the residents of Wonderland show that holding down a dream relationship, an attractive career and maintaining solid friendships is sometimes anything other than plain sailing.

Cast

Main 
 Anna Bamford as Miranda Beaumont
 Michael Dorman as Tom Wilcox
 Emma Lung as Collette Riger
 Tracy Mann as Maggie Wilcox
 Glenn McMillan as Carlos Dos Santos
 Ben Mingay as Rob Duffy
 Tim Ross as Steve Beaumont
 Brooke Satchwell as Grace Barnes
 Jessica Tovey as Dani Varvaris

Recurring 
 Simone Kessell as Sasha Clarke (10 episodes)
 Les Hill as Max Saliba (10 episodes)
 Martin Sacks as Callan Beaumont (9 episodes)
 Michael Booth as Harry Hewitt (6 episodes)
 Peter Phelps as Warwick Wilcox (5 episodes)

Guest 
 Mia Pistorius as Jade (5 episodes)
 Sandy Winton as Liam (3 episodes)
 Christie Whelan Browne as Kristen (1 episode)
 Elise Jansen as Ava McGuire (1 episode)
 Mirko Grillini as Trent Morris (1 episode)
 Claire Lovering as Rebecca Morris (1 episode)
 Gia Carides as Helena (1 episode)
 Kate Raison as Katharine Barnes (1 episode)

Episodes 
{| class="wikitable plainrowheaders" style="margin: auto; width: 100%"
|-
!! style="background-color:#FA6831; text-align: center;" width=5%|No. inseries
!! style="background-color:#FA6831; text-align: center;" width=5%|No. inseason
!! style="background-color:#FA6831; text-align: center;" width=25%|Title
!! style="background-color:#FA6831; text-align: center;" width=16%|Directed by
!! style="background-color:#FA6831; text-align: center;" width=28%|Written by
!! style="background-color:#FA6831; text-align: center;" width=14%|Original air date
!! style="background-color:#FA6831; text-align: center;" width=7%|Australian viewers
|-

|}

Ratings

References 

2015 Australian television seasons